A Woman at her Toilet  is an oil-on-panel painting by Jan Steen. It was painted in 1663 and is now a part of the Royal Collection, having been acquired by King George IV in 1821. The painting is housed in Buckingham Palace.

The composition depicts a partly undressed woman, seated on her bed and putting on a stocking. She faces the viewer with a flirtatious gaze. An arched doorway separates the woman's space from the viewer's space. Steen differentiates the two spaces by the use of symbols that would have been understood by his contemporaries. The arch in the foreground "represents moral probity emphasised by the symbolism of the sunflower (constancy), the grapevines (domestic virtue) and the weeping cherub (chastised profane love)". In contrast, the room beyond the arch is the domain of vanity and profane love, symbolized by a skull, an extinguished candle, and a lute with a broken string. The painting is full of sexual innuendo, some of it based on word play. For instance, the Dutch word for stocking (kous) was a slang term for fornication; the Dutch word for the chamber pot (piespot) below the bed can be combined with kous to form a derogatory word for women – pieskous.

Notes 

1663 paintings
Books in art
Dogs in art
Musical instruments in art

A Woman at her Toilet is an oil-on-panel painting by Jan Steen. It was painted in 1663 and is now a part of the Royal Collection, having been acquired by King George IV in 1821.[1] The painting is housed in Buckingham Palace.

The composition depicts a partly undressed woman, seated on her bed and putting on a stocking. She faces the viewer with a flirtatious gaze. An arched doorway separates the woman's space from the viewer's space. Steen differentiates the two spaces by the use of symbols that would have been understood by his contemporaries. The arch in the foreground "represents moral probity emphasised by the symbolism of the sunflower (constancy), the grapevines (domestic virtue) and the weeping cherub (chastised profane love)".[1] In contrast, the room beyond the arch is the domain of vanity and profane love, symbolized by a skull, an extinguished candle, and a lute with a broken string.[1] The painting is full of sexual innuendo, some of it based on word play. For instance, the Dutch word for stocking (kous) was a slang term for fornication; the Dutch word for the chamber pot (piespot) below the bed can be combined with kous to form a derogatory word for women – pieskous.[1]

Jan Steen
A Woman at her Toilet is an oil-on-panel painting by Jan Steen.
Overview
The composition depicts a partly undressed woman, seated on her bed and putting on a stocking. She faces the viewer with a flirtatious gaze. An arched doorway separates the woman's space from the viewer's space. 
Meaning
 The arch in the foreground "represents moral probity emphasised by the symbolism of the sunflower (constancy), the grapevines (domestic virtue) and the weeping cherub (chastised profane love)".[1] In contrast, the room beyond the arch is the domain of vanity and profane love, symbolized by a skull, an extinguished candle, and a lute with a broken string.[1] The painting is full of sexual innuendo, some of it based on word play. For instance, the Dutch word for stocking (kous) was a slang term for fornication; the Dutch word for the chamber pot (piespot) below the bed can be combined with kous to form a derogatory word for women – pieskous.[1]
Location
It was painted in 1663 and is now a part of the Royal Collection, having been acquired by King George IV in 1821.[1] The painting is housed in Buckingham Palace.